MedixGlobal is a UK-based market research consultancy providing online research in healthcare. Up until 2007, MedixGlobal produced not-for-profit studies  and publications concerning issues such as euthanasia and patient confidentiality.

References

Market research companies of the United Kingdom